Luxembourg sent a team of 13 to compete at the 2008 Summer Olympics, held in Beijing, People's Republic of China.

Cycling

Road

Gymnastics

Artistic

Judo

Sailing

Men

M = Medal race; EL = Eliminated – did not advance into the medal race; CAN = Race cancelled;

Swimming

Men

Women

Table tennis

Triathlon

References

External links
 Sports Reference – Luxembourg at the 2008 Summer Olympics

Nations at the 2008 Summer Olympics
2008 Summer Olympics
Summer Olympics